Johnny Kastl is an American actor, best known for his role as Dr. Doug Murphy on the medical comedy Scrubs. He has since made cameo appearances in several Hollywood productions and played other parts on television including the role of Todd Jaracki on The Beast with Patrick Swayze.

Early life
Born in Oklahoma and raised in Texas, he attended Washington University in St. Louis, where he double-majored in Biology and Drama. He acted in many plays and was a co-founder and active member of a student sketch comedy group called "The Kaktabulz."

Career

Kastl has made appearances in the blockbuster films Hulk and War of the Worlds.

Kastl had a recurring role on Scrubs for 8 years from 2001 to 2009 as Dr. Doug Murphy, the totally incompetent doctor who finally finds his calling as a very competent forensic pathologist. However, he asked to be allowed to "sit out" the fourth season of Scrubs as he had broken both his heels in a ski jumping accident. This was written into the show to keep the character around and, as described on the DVD commentary by creator Bill Lawrence, "We felt that breaking both of his feet was a very "Doug" thing to do, so we decided to write it into the show."

He had a recurring role on Patrick Swayze's The Beast as FBI agent Todd Jaracki, friend of Ellis Dove (Travis Fimmel) for the 1 year it was on television.

Personal life
Prior to moving to Los Angeles, Johnny was employed as a Manager at Microsoft in Chicago, Illinois.

He is an avid golfer and won The Golf Channel's Big-Break All Star Challenge Scrubs competition, beating out Robert Maschio ("The Todd") in the final match.

While attending law school at the University of Iowa, he worked as a law clerk at the U.S. Attorney's Office. He now practices law in Chicago, Illinois.

Filmography
The Tempest (2001) - Boatswain
 Scrubs (2003-2009) 
Hulk (2003) - Soldier
Ball & Chain (2004) - Monty
War of the Worlds (2005) - Boston Soldier
I Gotta Be Better Than Keanu (2007) - Slimy Agent

References

External links

American male film actors
American male television actors
Living people
Male actors from Oklahoma
Male actors from Texas
Washington University in St. Louis alumni
Year of birth missing (living people)
University of Iowa College of Law alumni